Bastel, bastle, or bastille houses are a type of construction found along the Anglo-Scottish border, in the areas formerly plagued by border reivers.  They are fortified farmhouses, characterised by security measures against raids.  Their name is said to derive from the French word "bastille".

Characteristics
The characteristics of the classic bastle house are extremely thick stone walls (about 1 metre thick), with the ground floor devoted to stable space for the most valuable animals, and a vaulted stone or flat timber floor between it and the first floor with internal access such as a stairway or ladder.  The family's living quarters were on the floor above the ground, and during the times before the suppression of the reivers, were only reachable by a ladder which was pulled up from the inside at night.  The windows were small or even only arrow slits.

Bastle houses have many characteristics in common with military blockhouses, the main difference being that a bastle was intended primarily as a family dwelling, instead of a pure fortification.

Many bastle houses survive today; their construction ensured that they would last a very long time, but most are either ruined or much altered for use as residences or farm buildings.  They may be seen on both sides of the Anglo-Scottish border.  Some well-preserved examples are Thropton Pele, Hole Bastle, Woodhouses Bastle and Black Middens Bastle.

See also
 Architecture in early modern Scotland#Vernacular architecture (section)
 Bastille
 La Haye Sainte
 Peel tower
 Scottish Vernacular
 Tower house
 Tower houses in Britain and Ireland
 Vernacular architecture

References

Bibliography
Herman Gabriel Ramm, R. W. McDowall, Eric Mercer (1970) 'Shielings and Bastles. HMSO: London.
 

 
Border Reivers
Fortified houses
History of Northumberland
History of agriculture in England
History of the Scottish Borders
History of agriculture in Scotland
Housing in England
Housing in Scotland
House types in the United Kingdom
Human habitats
Rural Scotland
Scots language
Vernacular architecture